Mariya Mikhaylovna Lazuk (born October 15, 1983) is a Belarus rhythmic gymnast. She won a silver medal at the 2000 Summer Olympics. She was born in Minsk, Belarus.

References

1983 births
Living people
Belarusian rhythmic gymnasts
Olympic gymnasts of Belarus
Olympic silver medalists for Belarus
Olympic medalists in gymnastics
Medalists at the 2000 Summer Olympics
Gymnasts at the 2000 Summer Olympics
Gymnasts from Minsk